Vale Park is a football stadium in Stoke-on-Trent, England. It has been the home ground of Port Vale F.C. since 1950.

The ground has seen its capacity go up and down, its peak being 42,000 in 1954 against Blackpool, although a club record 49,768 managed to squeeze in for a 1960 FA Cup fifth round fixture against Aston Villa. Due to safety restrictions it now has a capacity of 15,036 (19,052 without limitations) having undergone major restructuring to make the stadium an all-seater venue in the 1990s.

Overview
At 525 feet above sea level it is the eleventh highest ground in the country, and second highest in the English Football League. The pitch is clay underneath the grass, rather than sand. These two factors make the pitch vulnerable to freezing temperatures. It is an extremely dry pitch, which often makes passing football quite difficult. There is also a coal seam under the pitch, and numerous mine shafts dotted around the local area, including many under the park opposite the ground.

The Vale Park pitch is one of the widest in the Football League. The pitch was originally laid over a filled-in marl hole and does not have a subsoil structure so is liable to flooding as it lacks proper drainage; a complete re-laying of the pitch would be needed to fix the issue (the club were quoted £450,000 for this work in 2014). Denis Dawson was head groundsman from 1966 to 1975; he succeeded Len Parton and was followed by Graham Mainwaring. The head groundsman from 1992 to 2022 was Steve Speed.

History

Following the club being informed that they would be evicted from The Old Recreation Ground by Stoke-on-Trent City Council, plans for a new stadium in a new area began to be made. In 1944 Hamil Road – the site of a former clay pit – was chosen, a site opposite Burslem Park, where the club had played its football in the early years of its existence. The development became known as The Wembley of the North due to the planned size of the stadium, plans which included an 80,000 capacity with room for 1,000 parked cars. The club's leadership had not allowed the club's third tier status or their lack of money to curb their ambition. Life-time seats were sold for £100 (the price of admission for roughly 200 matches) but fewer than 100 fans bought them. Also costing £100, the pitch was the most expensive ever laid in the country at the time.

The ground opened in 1950 having eventually cost £50,000, and boasting a capacity of 40,000 (360 seated). The original ground consisted of just two stands, the Railway stand and the Lorne Street main stand, with banks of terracing at the Bycars and Hamil ends of the ground. The Bycars end was originally the Swan Passage stand from the Old Recreation Ground, which was taken apart, moved across the city and re-erected as the funds for an entirely new stand had run out. The first match was a 1–0 victory over Newport County on 24 August 1950 in front of 30,196 rain-soaked spectators. Walter Aveyard took the honour of being the first to score at the ground. On the same day the stadium's name was revealed for the first time – Vale Park.

Vale Park initially had problems with drainage, causing many games of the 1950–51 season to be postponed. The problem was finally resolved in summer 1960, when new drains were installed to help ease the winter mud spots.

In summer 1951, 578 seats were installed on the Railway Terrace, bringing the seated capacity of Vale Park to 1,010. In 1954 the Railway Stand was built, as capacity gradually increased to 50,000 by the end of the decade. On 24 September 1958, Vale Park saw its first match under the new £17,000 floodlights, as the club beat West Bromwich Albion 5–3.

In summer 1973, the club erected a 2.5 feet high steel fence around the Bycars End to help combat hooliganism. A rare event occurred on 17 January 1976, when the Vale directors permitted rivals Stoke to play a home game against Middlesbrough at Vale Park. This happened because a severe gale severely damaged the Victoria Ground, whilst the gale also caused £2,000 worth of damage to Vale Park, the damage to Stoke's ground was much more severe. A crowd of 21,009 saw Stoke win 1–0.

In summer 1985 new safety regulations reduced Vale Park's capacity down to 16,800, and later again to 16,300. The summer of 1988 saw Vale Park given a £40,000 upgrade to repair the floodlights and a £20,000 electronic scoreboard was installed at the Hamil End. Three executive boxes were also purchased from Newcastle United, whilst facilities were opened to the local community. The following year the stadium was upgraded at a cost of £250,000, though grants helped to halve the cost for the club itself. In November 1989 a £100,000 disabled stand was installed –the first purpose built enclosure of its kind in the country. Despite this effort, inspectors closed the Bycars End down due to safety issues, and reduced the stadium's capacity to 12,000 after cutting the capacity of the Railway Paddock by two-thirds.

In summer 1990, 3,750 yellow and white seats were fitted in the Railway Paddock, and 1,121 seats were added to the upper tier of the Bycars End. The Bycars End roof was also removed for safety reasons, whilst a police box was constructed between the Railway Paddock and the Hamil End. The paddock at the front of the Railway Stand was later made into an all-seated area, with just the Lorne Street side left as a standing area. Vale fans stood for the last time on Lorne Street at the end of the 1997–98 season, with the stand being demolished before work began on a new £3 million structure. Work has yet to be finished on this, due to lack of finances and a change in ownership of the club. Despite the building work remaining uncompleted, the work done on the stadium under Bill Bell from 1985 had vastly improved the ground, as proven by the fact that sheep were once housed in the Railway Paddock toilets and allowed to graze on the pitch in the night; the toilets were notoriously unhygienic, and were replaced under Bill Bratt's reign in 2006.

The Valiant 2001 Charter stated that Bratt's management team would invest £400,000 to install under-soil heating in mid-2002, and to also quickly complete the Lorne Street stand. However it took until 2020 for the seats to be installed. Chairman Norman Smurthwaite separated Vale Park from Port Vale after taking the club out of administration in 2012. New high-tech floodlights were fitted in March 2019, paid for by the club's shirt sponsor. The stadium's ownership was returned to the club after Smurthwaite sold the club to Carol and Kevin Shanahan in May 2019. Five months later it was declared an "asset of community value status" by Stoke-on-Trent city council. The Shanahans spent £500,000 on ground improvement by summer 2021. Another £1.2 million was spent the following summer in order to make Vale Park a Championship standard ground.

Structure and facilities

The current stadium holds 15,036 supporters and has four stands: Lorne Street opposite to the Railway Paddock, and the Bycars End facing the Hamil Road End. The Lorne Street Stand is relatively new, seating 5,000 when complete (2,500 before completion), with 48 executive boxes. It was not completed when it opened, however 1,500 seats were installed in the Lorne Street stand in April 2020. At the time of the stadium's construction it was intended to be the grandstand. It contains the stadium's main entrance, dressing rooms, club offices and enterprise centre. The away stand has a capacity of 4,500. It holds the electronic scoreboard.

Other events
On 1 August 1981, Vale Park hosted a one-off rock concert, Heavy Metal Holocaust, featuring Motörhead, Ozzy Osbourne Band, Mahogany Rush, Triumph, Riot and Vardis. Around 20,000 attended the concert, raising £25,000 for the club. Lars Ulrich was also in attendance, months before he co-founded Metallica.

In 1985, the Stoke Spitfires American football team used the ground for matches. The stadium has hosted three England under-18 games. The first was a 7–2 win over Switzerland in November 1992 (which saw a Robbie Fowler hat-trick); the second was a 1–1 draw with Romania in September 1993; and the third was a goalless draw with Norway in June 2005. It also hosted a full international women's match on 7 April 2017, when England played Italy.

Records
A club record 49,768 attended a 1960 FA Cup fifth round fixture against Aston Villa. Other historic matches include the defeat of two reigning FA Cup champions in the competition, as Stanley Matthews' Blackpool were beaten 2–0 in February 1954, and then 42 years later holders Everton were dumped out 2–1. The biggest victory in a competitive match came in December 1958 when Gateshead were beaten 8–0.

References

Port Vale F.C.
1950 establishments in England
Sports venues completed in 1950
Football venues in England
Sports venues in Stoke-on-Trent
English Football League venues